William Partlow Daniel (November 20, 1915 – June 20, 2006), was an American politician and actor who served Governor of Guam from 1961 to 1963 and Democratic member of the Texas House of Representatives. Born in Dayton, Texas, and a graduate of Baylor University and a member of the Baylor University Chamber of Commerce, he spent the majority of his life working as a lawyer in Liberty County, Texas.

Early life
Bill Daniel was born into a wealthy and prominent Texas family, his older brother Price Daniel Sr. went on to become Governor of Texas, Texas Supreme Court Justice and a US Senator. Daniel made large donations to good causes especially to his alma mater Baylor University, several of the campus buildings are named after him, his late wife Vara and other members of the Daniel family.

Political career

Texas House of Representatives
From 1949 to 1953 he served as a Democratic Party member of the Texas House of Representatives for the 14th District, his brother Price had previously held this office from 1939 - 1945.

Governorship (1961–1963)
In 1961, U.S. President John F. Kennedy appointed him to the position of governor of Guam, an office that he held from May 20, 1961 to January 20, 1963.

His main achievement as Governor was to arrange for the removal of the requirement of a "security clearance" to enter or leave Guam, by persuading Kennedy to sign an Executive Order (No.11045), rescinding the one put in place during 1941 by President Franklin D. Roosevelt. The old (war-time) travel restrictions required that all civilians wishing to visit Guam needed to obtain approval from a senior US Navy officer based in Washington, D.C.; this often took weeks to obtain.  This was obviously an obstacle to development, especially in the area of tourism, and its removal greatly benefited the economy of the territory.

His appointment resulted in the first occasion in which brothers simultaneously held governorships in the United States, as his older brother Price was governor of Texas for the entire time of his service as governor of Guam.

Acting career
Bill Daniel appeared in the John Wayne film The Alamo playing Colonel Neill.  Daniel also provided the film with 400  longhorns and hundreds of horses from his ranch.
 Daniel's most memorable scene from the film is suggesting a courier named Smitty, played by Frankie Avalon, dismount for food and rest, which Smitty refuses in order to return to help defend the Alamo.

Death
Bill Daniel died on June 20, 2006 at his home in Liberty, Texas at the age of 90.

References

External links
Legislative Reference Library of Texas.

1915 births
2006 deaths
20th-century American politicians
Baylor University alumni
Governors of Guam
Guamanian Democrats
Male actors from Texas
Members of the Texas House of Representatives
People from Dayton, Texas
People from Liberty, Texas
Texas Democrats